Daniel John Lamb (born 7 September 1995) is an English cricketer, who plays for Lancashire. Lamb is an all-rounder.

Personal life
Lamb is from Preston, Lancashire, England, and attended St Michael's Church of England High School, Chorley. His sister Emma plays for Lancashire Women, and has played for Lancashire Thunder.

Career
Lamb has played club cricket for Bramhall in the Cheshire County Cricket League, and Leigh. 

In 2015, Lamb signed a scholarship deal with Lancashire, having already featured in Second XI matches for them. Lamb made his List A debut for Lancashire in the 2017 Royal London One-Day Cup on 14 May 2017. He made his Twenty20 debut for Lancashire in the 2017 NatWest t20 Blast on 9 July 2017. In June 2018, Lamb made his first-class debut as a Concussion substitute for Joe Mennie. He was the first concussion substitute in English cricket. He made six appearances in the 2018 t20 Blast, as Lancashire reached the finals day. Later in same year, he signed a contract with Lancashire until 2020.

In a 2019 match against Glamorgan, Lamb took 4/70. In April 2021, during the 2021 County Championship match against Kent, Lamb scored his maiden century in first-class cricket with 125 runs. In July 2021, in the 2021 Royal London One-Day Cup, Lamb took his first five-wicket haul in List A cricket.

References

External links
 

1995 births
Living people
Cheshire cricketers
Cricketers from Preston, Lancashire
English cricketers
Lancashire cricketers